

 

The Other Slavery: The Uncovered Story of Indian Enslavement in America is a book about Native American slavery written by Andrés Reséndez and published by Houghton Mifflin Harcourt in 2016.

About
The Other Slavery explores the history of Native American enslavement in the Americas. The book argues that Native American enslavement has been historically overlooked and marginalized.

Resendez shows that slavery existed in the Americas before Europeans arrived; Indigenous peoples and later European colonizers enslaved indigenous peoples. This practice continued for centuries. The author documents the horrific treatment of Native American slaves, including brutal labor, sexual exploitation, and physical violence and compares treatment of Native American slaves to the experiences of enslaved Africans.

Recognition
The Other Slavery was a finalist for the National Book Awards in 2016 for Nonfiction. Reséndez won the 2017 Bancroft Prize in American History and Diplomacy for The Other Slavery.

Reviews
Popular media
 
 
 

Academic journals

Citation

About the author

Similar or related works
 Plantation Enterprise in Colonial South Carolina by S. Max Edelson
 Money, Trade, and Power: The Evolution of Colonial South Carolina's Plantation Society by Jack P. Greene
 Red, White, and Black Make Blue: Indigo in the Fabric of Colonial South Carolina Life by Andrea Feeser

See also
 Slavery in the United States
 Slavery in colonial Spanish America

References

Notes

Citations

External links
 The Other Slavery, HarperCollins.

History books about the United States